Central United Church is a historic congregation of the United Church of Canada located in the community of Weston, now a neighbourhood of Toronto, Ontario, Canada.

The congregation began as part of the Methodist Episcopal Church, a forerunner of both the Methodist Church of Canada (1884) and the United Church of Canada (1925).  The first church building, a log structure, was erected in 1821, followed by a larger brick church constructed in 1849.  The present building, dedicated in 1887, and built in the Gothic Revival style, has been altered and updated on several occasions, but retains the landmark tower.  The tower includes examples of abat-sons.  The church was one of the final projects of William Henry Mallory Sr., architect.

The congregation has a unique musical heritage.  The organ, constructed by Casavant Frères, was dedicated in 1950 as a memorial to members of the congregation who gave their lives in the Second World War.  The Chancellors, a youth choir active from 1968 to 1980, produced five record albums and toured extensively.

The congregation has been served by several notable clergy, including Egerton Ryerson, historian George Playter and E.A. Pearson, the father of Prime Minister Lester B. Pearson.

Today, the church is well known for outreach into the community through the Weston King Neighbourhood Centre.  The Centre provides meals, education and advocacy.

See also
List of oldest buildings and structures in Toronto
List of United Church of Canada churches in Toronto

References

External links

United Church of Canada churches in Toronto
Gothic Revival architecture in Toronto
Gothic Revival church buildings in Canada